is a Korean-born Japanese writer of mystery, fantasy, horror and historical fiction.

Works in English translation
Novels
The Resurrection Fireplace (original title: Hirakasete Itadaki Kōei Desu), trans. Matt Treyvaud, Bento Books, 2019
Short stories
"The Midsummer Emissary" (original title: Fuzuki no Shisha), trans. Ginny Tapley Takemori (Kaiki: Uncanny Tales from Japan, Volume 3: Tales of the Metropolis, Kurodahan Press, 2012)
"Sunset" (original title: Yuhi ga Shizumu), trans. Karen Sandness (Speculative Japan 3: Silver Bullet and Other Tales of Japanese Science Fiction and Fantasy, Kurodahan Press, 2012)

Awards
 1973 – Shosetsu Gendai New Writers Prize:  (short story)
 1985 – Mystery Writers of Japan Award for Best Novel:  (mystery novel)
 1986 – Naoki Prize:  (historical novel)
 1990 – Shibata Renzaburo Prize:  (fantasy short story collection)
 1998 – Yoshikawa Eiji Prize for Literature:  (mystery novel)
 2012 – Honkaku Mystery Award: The Resurrection Fireplace (mystery novel)
 2013 – Japan Mystery Literature Award for Lifetime Achievement

Main works

Edward Turner series
Historical mystery series set in 18th-century London
 , 2011 (The Resurrection Fireplace)
 , 2013
 , 2021

Other mystery novels
 , 1975
 , 1978
 , 1979
 , 1982
 , 1982
 , 1984
 , 1984
 , 1984
 , 1985
 , 1986
 , 1986
 , 1986
 , 1987
 , 1988
 , 1988
 , 1989
 , 1997
 , 2007

Other
 , 2013 - The story of Grace O'Malley

Film adaptations
 Sharaku (1995; based on her 1994 historical novel, Sharaku)

See also

Japanese detective fiction

References

External links
 The Resurrection Fireplace | Bento Books
 

1930 births
Place of birth missing (living people)
Japanese women short story writers
Japanese mystery writers
Japanese crime fiction writers
Mystery Writers of Japan Award winners
Honkaku Mystery Award winners
Japanese fantasy writers
Japanese horror writers
Japanese historical novelists
Women mystery writers
Japanese women novelists
Living people
Women science fiction and fantasy writers
Women horror writers
20th-century Japanese novelists
21st-century Japanese novelists
20th-century Japanese women writers
21st-century Japanese women writers
Women historical novelists
20th-century Japanese short story writers
21st-century Japanese short story writers